Jack Bennett may refer to:
Jack Bennett (footballer, born 1910) (1910–1975), Australian footballer for Melbourne
Jack Bennett (footballer, born 1920) (1920–1997), Australian footballer for Carlton
Jack Bennett (footballer, born 1922) (1922–2009), Australian footballer for North Melbourne
Jack Bennett (rugby league), rugby league footballer of the 1920s and 1930s
Jack A. W. Bennett (1911–1981), New Zealand-born literary scholar

See also
John Bennett (disambiguation)